Hardin County is a county located in the west central portion of the U.S. state of Ohio. As of the 2020 census, the population was 30,696. Its county seat and largest city is Kenton. The county was created in 1820 and later organized in 1833. It is named for John Hardin, an officer in the American Revolution.

Geography

Adjacent counties
Hancock County (north)
Wyandot County (northeast)
Marion County (east)
Union County (southeast)
Logan County (south)
Auglaize County (southwest)
Allen County (northwest)

Demographics

2000 census
At the 2000 census, there were 31,945 people, 11,963 households and 8,134 families living in the county. The population density was 68 per square mile (26/km2). There were 12,907 housing units at an average density of 27 per square mile (11/km2). The racial makeup of the county was 97.54% White, 0.70% Black or African American, 0.25% Native American, 0.43% Asian, 0.23% from other races, and 0.85% from two or more races. 0.78% of the population were Hispanic or Latino of any race. 96.9% spoke English and 1.4% German as their first language.

There were 11,963 households, of which 31.40% had children under the age of 18 living with them, 55.00% were married couples living together, 8.90% had a female householder with no husband present, and 32.00% were non-families. 26.50% of all households were made up of individuals, and 10.80% had someone living alone who was 65 years of age or older. The average household size was 2.51 and the average family size was 3.03.

24.30% of the population were under the age of 18, 15.40% from 18 to 24, 26.00% from 25 to 44, 21.30% from 45 to 64, and 12.90% who were 65 years of age or older. The median age was 33 years. For every 100 females there were 95.90 males. For every 100 females age 18 and over, there were 92.70 males.

The median household income was $34,440 and the median family income was $42,395. Males had a median income of $33,393 compared with $21,695 for females. The per capita income for the county was $16,200. About 8.90% of families and 13.20% of the population were below the poverty line, including 15.20% of those under age 18 and 11.90% of those age 65 or over.

2010 census
As of the 2010 United States Census, there were 32,058 people, 11,762 households, and 7,950 families living in the county. The racial makeup of the county was 96.7% white, 0.8% black or African American, 0.6% Asian, 0.2% American Indian, 0.5% from other races, and 1.3% from two or more races. Those of Hispanic or Latino origin made up 1.3% of the population. In terms of ancestry, 33.0% were German, 15.1% were Irish, 13.2% were American, and 9.6% were English.

Of the 11,762 households, 32.3% had children under the age of 18 living with them, 52.4% were married couples living together, 10.1% had a female householder with no husband present, 32.4% were non-families, and 26.7% of all households were made up of individuals. The average household size was 2.53 and the average family size was 3.05. The median age was 34.7 years.

The median income for a household in the county was $41,343 and the median income for a family was $55,274. Males had a median income of $41,191 versus $32,313 for females. The per capita income for the county was $19,100. About 9.6% of families and 16.2% of the population were below the poverty line, including 18.5% of those under age 18 and 6.0% of those age 65 or over.

Politics
Hardin County is a Republican Party stronghold. The last Democrat to win the county was Lyndon B. Johnson in his 1964 landslide.

|}

Airports
Ada Airport  is a privately owned, public-use airport located one nautical mile (1.85 km) northwest of the central business district of Ada, a village in Hardin County.

Hardin County Airport  is the largest paved facility and is located 3 miles south of Kenton, Ohio on CR 135. The runway is 4,803 feet long at an elevation of 1,030 feet. Maintenance, fuel and storage are available.

Major highways

Science
Currently there is a working Artesian aquifer operating in the county.

Media
Two newspapers, the daily The Kenton Times of Kenton and the weekly The Ada Herald of Ada, operate in Hardin County.

Radio stations include WKTN of Kenton and WOHA of Ada, a radio station owned by Holy Family Communications.

WOCB-LP TV48 is a local Christian television station in downtown Kenton covering channels 39.1-39.4.

Communities

City
Kenton (county seat)

Villages

Ada
Alger
Dunkirk
Forest
McGuffey
Mount Victory
Patterson
Ridgeway

Townships

Blanchard
Buck
Cessna
Dudley
Goshen
Hale
Jackson
Liberty
Lynn
Marion
McDonald
Pleasant
Roundhead
Taylor Creek
Washington

https://web.archive.org/web/20160715023447/http://www.ohiotownships.org/township-websites

Census-designated place
Dola

Unincorporated communities

 Blanchard
 Foraker
 Grant
 Grassy Point
 Hepburn 
 Holden
 Huntersville
 Jumbo
 Jump
 Maysville
 Mentzer
 Pfeiffer
 Roundhead
 Silver Creek
 Yelverton

Notable people
 Nehemiah Green, fourth Governor of Kansas
From Kenton

 James S. Robinson, Civil War General and Secretary of State for Ohio
 Delano Moray, Medal of Honor Recipient

 John R. Goodin, Democratic congressman from Kansas
 William Lawrence, Republican congressman involved with the attempt to impeach Andrew Johnson
 Jacob Parrott, first recipient of the Medal of Honor
 Paul Robinson, creator of the long-running "Etta Kett" comic strip for King Features Syndicate
 Brigadier General John (Mike) Murray
From Ada
 Rollo May, an American existential psychologist
 Lee Tressel, football coach, father of former Ohio State University football coach Jim Tressel
 John Berton, award-winning computer graphics animator and visual effects supervisor.
 Carey Orr, cartoonist.
From Alger
 Ray Brown — Homestead Grays pitcher
From Dunkirk
 Willard Rhodes, ethnomusicologist (1901–1992)
 Dean Pees, NFL coach

See also
National Register of Historic Places listings in Hardin County, Ohio

References

External links

Hardin County Chamber & Business Alliance
Hardin County GIS webpage

 
1833 establishments in Ohio
Populated places established in 1833